The following lists events that happened during 1880 in the Kingdom of Belgium.

Incumbents
Monarch: Leopold II
Prime Minister: Walthère Frère-Orban

Events

 January – The White slave trade affair is exposed in Brussels and attracts international attention.
 7 March – Reception in the winter garden at Royal Palace of Laken to celebrate the engagement of Princess Stéphanie of Belgium to Rudolf, Crown Prince of Austria.
 24 May – Provincial elections
 5 June – Belgian government breaks off diplomatic relations with the Holy See.
 8 June – Partial legislative elections of 1880
 16 August – Celebration of the fiftieth anniversary of Belgian independence in Cinquantenaire Park
 22-28 August – International Educational Congress held in Brussels.
 September – Queen Marie Henriette visits Aachen for her health.
 25 December – Pope Leo XIII issues a breve to establish a new chair in Thomist philosophy at the Catholic University of Louvain.

Publications
Periodicals
 Bulletin de l'Association Belge de Photographie, vol. 7
 La Jeune Belgique begins publication.

Exhibition catalogues
 F.G. Dumas, Catalogue illustré de l'exposition historique de l'art belge et du Musée moderne de Bruxelles (Brussels and Paris)
 Exposition nationale: IVe section, industries d'art en Belgique antérieurs au XIXe siècle (Brussels, Veuve Ch. Vanderauwera)

Art and architecture

Buildings
 Cinquantenaire

Paintings
 Jan Verhas, The Parade of the Schools in 1878

Births
 10 January – Frans Van Cauwelaert, politician (died 1961)
 4 December – Eugène Soudan, politician (died 1960).

Deaths
 30 January – Paul Devaux (born 1801), politician
 28 April – Louis Dubois (born 1830), painter
 13 May – Lievin De Winne (born 1821), painter

References

 
1880s in Belgium
Belgium
Years of the 19th century in Belgium
Belgium